"Kotoba ni Dekinakute/Shining Butterfly" is the fourth single by the vocal group Bright. The bridge of "Shining Butterfly" drew comparisons to Janet Jackson's "Feedback," using a similar melody.

This single includes a cover of "(You Make Me Feel Like) A Natural Woman", originally performed by Aretha Franklin.

Track listing 
CD track list
 Kotoba ni Dekinakute (言葉にできなくて; Can't Put into Words)
 Shining Butterfly
 (You Make Me Feel Like A) Natural Woman
 言葉にできなくて(instrumental）
 Shining Butterfly(instrumental）
 (You Make Me Feel Like A) Natural Woman(instrumental）

DVD track list
 言葉にできなくて (music video)
 Shining Butterfly (music video)
 Theme of Bright: Notes 4 You／Love & Joy (live video) From Big Cat, March 20, 2009
 Bonus Track 言葉にできなくて (making-of video)

Chart

References

2009 singles
Bright (Japanese band) songs
Rhythm Zone singles